The 2020–21 Turkish Airlines EuroLeague was the 21st season of the modern era of the EuroLeague and the 11th under the title sponsorship of Turkish Airlines. Including the competition's previous incarnation as the FIBA Europe Champions Cup, this was the 64th season of the premier basketball competition for European men's clubs. The season started 1 October 2020. 

As the season was the first to be played after the previous season was abandoned due to travel restrictions caused by the COVID-19 pandemic, the EuroLeague board ruled that the 18 teams from the previous season would stay in the league. Anadolu Efes won the championship after defeating Barcelona in the championship game.

Team allocation
A total of 18 teams from 10 countries participated in the 2020–21 EuroLeague.

Distribution
The following is the access list for this season.

Qualified teams
The labels in the parentheses show how each team qualified for the place of its starting round:
EL: Played in curtailed 2019–20 EuroLeague

Teams

Venues and locations

Personnel and sponsorship

Notes
1. Cultura del Esfuerzo is the motto of the club.

Managerial changes

Referees
A total of 70 Euroleague Basketball officials set to work on the 2020–21 season in EuroLeague and EuroCup:

Regular season

League table

Results

1 The match, originally scheduled for 13 October, was postponed to 8 December after positive COVID-19 tests on Zenit  following decision on 19 October by Euroleague on rescheduling games affected by positive tests.
2 The match, originally scheduled for 15 October, was postponed to 23 November after positive COVID-19 tests on Zenit following decision on 19 October by Euroleague on rescheduling games affected by positive tests.

Playoffs

Playoffs series are best-of-five. The first team to win three games wins the series. A 2–2–1 format is used – teams with home-court advantage play games 1, 2, and 5 at home, while their opponents host games 3 and 4. Games 4 and 5 are only played if necessary. The four winning teams advance to the Final Four.

Series

Final Four

The Final Four, held over a single weekend, is the last phase of the season. The four remaining teams play a single knockout round on Friday evening, with the two winners advancing to the championship game. Sunday starts with the third-place game, followed by the championship game. The Final Four was played at the Lanxess Arena in Cologne, Germany, on 28–30 May 2021.

Attendances
To start the season only seven teams played with spectators. Between 100 and 7,500 socially-distanced fans, depending on the venue and country, were allowed into the arenas of CSKA, Zenit, Fenerbahçe, Khimki, Maccabi, Žalgiris, Valencia, Milan, Baskonia, ASVEL, ALBA and Crvena zvezda.

Source: EuroLeague

Top 10

Awards
All official awards of the 2020–21 EuroLeague.

EuroLeague MVP 
  Vasilije Micić ( Anadolu Efes)

EuroLeague Final Four MVP 
  Vasilije Micić ( Anadolu Efes)

All-EuroLeague Teams

Alphonso Ford Top Scorer Trophy
  Alexey Shved ( Khimki)

Best Defender
  Edy Tavares ( Real Madrid)

Rising Star
  Usman Garuba ( Real Madrid)

MVP of the Round

 
Regular season

Playoffs

MVP of the Month

Statistics

Individual statistics

Rating

Source: EuroLeague

Points

Source: EuroLeague

Rebounds

Source: EuroLeague

Assists

Source: EuroLeague

Blocks

Source: 
EuroLeague

Other statistics

Individual game highs

Team statistics

See also
2020–21 EuroCup Basketball
2020–21 Basketball Champions League
2020–21 FIBA Europe Cup

References

External links
Official website

 
EuroLeague seasons